Ichthyosis-intellectual disability-dwarfism-renal impairment is a very rare autosomal recessive ichthyotic genetic disorder which consists of congenital ichthyosis, intellectual disabilities, dwarfism/short stature and renal impairment. This condition has been described only in four members of an Iranian family and was discovered in the summer of 1975.

References 

Diseases and disorders